Love Bites is an American anthology comedy-drama television series originally planned for the 2010–11 television season on the NBC network that eventually aired as a summer replacement series. It premiered in its regular Thursday night time slot at 10:00 pm Eastern/9:00 pm Central, on June 2, 2011. On July 11, 2011, NBC canceled the show and the series finale aired on July 21, 2011.

Plot

Love Bites was originally set to focus on Annie (Becki Newton) and Frannie (Jordana Spiro), two single women exploring the ups and downs of dating, love, and sex, while dealing with the fact that all their other friends have married.

Off-camera complications, including Spiro's commitment to another show and Newton's pregnancy, delayed production, and the show was eventually retooled as an anthology series, focusing on three short vignettes per episode similar to Love, American Style. Each story was often intertwined by a common theme or character, and was related to the three main protagonists:  Annie (Becki Newton), Judd (Greg Grunberg), and Colleen (Constance Zimmer/Pamela Adlon in the pilot).

Cast and characters

Main
Becki Newton as Annie Matopoulos
Greg Grunberg as Judd Rouscher
Constance Zimmer as Colleen Rouscher

Guest

Episodes

Development and production
In January 2010, NBC announced Love Bites as one of many pilots on its early development slate.  Becki Newton was cast in late February, followed quickly by Jordana Spiro. Marc Buckland was confirmed to be directing the pilot in early March. In May 2010, NBC announced it had green-lit the series. The series was scheduled to air on Thursday nights in the 10–11 pm slot starting in the fall of 2010. On May 17, 2010, Greg Grunberg announced via Twitter that he will be joining the cast.

A number of changes eventually prevented the series from going into production as planned. On June 24, 2010, Jordana Spiro left the series due to her role on My Boys, for which she had a contract that bound her to continue on that program. Krysten Ritter guest starred in the pilot episode as Cassie, replacing Spiro. The premise of the show had to change when Becki Newton announced her pregnancy; her character was a virgin.  Before changes could be made, showrunner Cindy Chupack departed for personal reasons. NBC was forced to move Love Bites to midseason 2010–11, and The Apprentice up to fall 2010 to take the timeslot. Pamela Adlon was originally cast as Colleen in the unaired pilot episode. She was replaced by Constance Zimmer in the subsequent aired  episodes. It was announced in July 2010 that Tracy Poust and Jon Kinnally would serve as showrunners for the series.

On December 9, 2010, Deadline Hollywood reported that NBC had cut back the episode order from 13 to 9 episodes. This would be followed by Spiro, Newton and Grunberg landing pilots elsewhere.

After numerous delays, NBC announced that the 9 completed episodes were to premiere on June 2, 2011.

References

External links
 

2010s American anthology television series
2010s American comedy-drama television series
2010s American romantic comedy television series
2011 American television series debuts
2011 American television series endings
English-language television shows
NBC original programming
Television series by Universal Television
Television series by Working Title Television